Ras Ajdir, alternatively Ras Jdir or Ras Ejder, is a small coastal town on the border between Tunisia and Libya and Libya's most northerly point.

Science
It is the site of an experimental station for wind and solar power for desalination.

Transport
The town is a major transport hub and border crossing, for trade by road between Tunisia and Libya. From 15 February – 15 March 2007, 21,758 foreigners entered and 8,112 left through Ras Ajdir.

Ras Ajdir is a likely border station on the new Libyan Railways line, which is under construction in 2007. An agreement has been signed for a link to Tunisian Railways.

Libyan civil war
In 2011, during the Libyan Civil War, rebel forces attempted to take control of the crossing from loyalist forces. On 27 August, the border town was secured by the National Transitional Council forces.

See also
Railway stations in Libya

Demographics
As of 2019, the population of the small coastal town of Ra's Ajdir is 6,469 people consisting of 6,023 Libyans, 306 Tunisians, 87 Algerians, 31 Italians, 9 Chadians, 7 Egyptians, and 6 Maltese.

References

Libya–Tunisia border crossings
Port cities and towns in Libya
Populated places in Nuqat al Khams District